was a Japanese daimyō of the Edo period, who ruled the Owari Domain. He was son of shōgun Tokugawa Ienari. His childhood name was Naoshichiro (直七郎).

Family
 Father: Tokugawa Ienari
 Mother: Ohana no Kata (?-1845) later Seiren'in
 Wives:
 Aihime later Shunjoin, daughter of Tokugawa Narimasa
 Fukuko later Kirein, daughter of Konoe Motosaki

References

1819 births
1839 deaths
Lords of Owari